The 2012 FA Challenge Cup was the 45th edition of the FA Challenge Cup, Botswana's premier football knockout tournament. It was sponsored by Coca-Cola and was known as the Coca-Cola Cup for sponsorship reasons. It started with the extra preliminary round on 24 March 2012 and concluded with the final on 5 August 2012. The winner qualified for the 2013 CAF Confederation Cup.

Botswana Premier League side Extension Gunners were the defending champions but were eliminated by BDF XI in the round of 16. Gaborone United went on to win the title for a sixth time, matching Township Rollers's record for most FA Cup wins.

Extra preliminary round

Preliminary round

Round of 32

Round of 16

Quarterfinals

Semifinals

Final

Top scorers

Awards

References

Football in Botswana